Roy D. Simon is the Howard Lichtenstein Distinguished Professor Emeritus of Legal Ethics at Hofstra University.

He was the 2008 Democratic Party nominee for the New York State Senate, running against then-Republican State Senate Majority Leader Dean Skelos. He currently resides in West Hempstead and ran to be the State Senator representing the Ninth District in Long Island. Some of these communities include the Five Towns, Valley Stream, Rockville Centre, and others. Political pundits acknowledged that it would be difficult to oust Dean Skelos.

Education and career
Simon attended Williams College for his undergraduate degree and NYU Law School for his JD. He started his academic work as an instructor at the Washington University School of Law before being appointed to the post of professor at the Maurice A. Deane School of Law nine years later where he served as Howard Lichtenstein Distinguished Professor of Legal Ethics from 2003 to 2011. An author of New York Rules of Professional Conduct Annotated, Simon serves as editor-in-chief of the New York University Law Review. He also served as a clerk to the U.S. District Judge Robert R. Merhige Jr. in Richmond, Virginia and then practiced law at Jenner & Block in Chicago. Simon served as monthly columnist for the New York Professional Responsibility Report, from 1998 to 2011 and prior to it served as chairman for the Nassau County Bar. Simon was is a member of the NY State Bar since 1995. He currently serves as chairman of the NY State Bar's Committee on Standards of Professional Conduct, and prior to it held the same position for its Committee on Professional Ethics from 2008 to 2011.

References

Legal ethics
Living people
Williams College alumni
New York University School of Law alumni
Hofstra University faculty
People from West Hempstead, New York
Year of birth missing (living people)
Washington University in St. Louis faculty